The Washington State Senate elections were held on November 2, 2010, in which about half of the state's 49 legislative districts choose a state senator for a four-year term to the Washington State Senate. The other half of state senators are chosen in the next biennial election, so that about half of the senators, along with all the members of the Washington State House of Representatives, are elected every two years.

24 seats were regularly scheduled to be up this cycle, along with 1 additional seat holding a special election to fill an unexpired term: the 28th district, held by appointed Senator Steve Litzow, whose former incumbent Fred Jarrett vacated the seat.

Summary of results 

 Districts not listed were not up for election in 2020.

Detailed results 

 Note: Washington uses a top two primary system. Official primary results can be obtained here and official general election results here.

District 6

District 7

District 8

District 13

District 15

District 21

District 26

District 29

District 30

District 31

District 32

District 33

District 34

District 35

District 36

District 37

District 38

District 41

District 42

District 43

District 44

District 45

District 46

District 47

District 48

References

Notes 

2010 Washington (state) elections
Washington State Senate elections
Washington State Senate